WWE 2K was a professional wrestling video game developed by Visual Concepts and n-Space, and published by Take-Two Interactive for iOS and Android devices. It is the first mobile video game to be published under the WWE 2K brand.

Gameplay
WWE 2K is a simulation-style wrestling that features authentic in-ring WWE action where you can train yourself to get better at the game anytime you play the game without having to reach any specific point, play in a career mode with a created superstar or a WWE superstar, create your own superstar, play live multiplayer matches and unlock rewards to further customize your created superstar. The roster and venue's is very limited to 4 arenas, 19 WWE superstars which sees the current and legends of John Cena, Brock Lesnar, Hulk Hogan, Sting, Triple H, Undertaker, Daniel Bryan, Seth Rollins, Dean Ambrose, Roman Reigns, Batista, Kane, Bray Wyatt, Big Show, Wade Barrett, Cesaro, Rusev, Randy Orton and Sheamus.

This game features swipe and touch controls for grappling, striking, running, climbing and other actions. There are some comprehensive movesets for each superstar to pull off while you're playing a match. Also, the comeback ability and full entrances is in the game as well. Additionally, There are three fan-favorite match types to play inside a one-on-one versus only:

 singles match: a standard match that can be won by pinfall or submission.

 steel cage match: a cage match that can be won by escaping the cage.

 no disqualification match: a weapons match that can be won by pinfall or submission.

Reception
Nick Tylwalk of Gamezebo.com rated the game 3.5/5 stars and he praised the controls, the multiplayer feature and stated there is "plenty of WWE authenticity in graphics and audio", but the negatives of the game are the fact it 'leaves you wanting more' and the game is slow and imprecise in the gameplay. Bryan Vore of Game Informer criticised the game's in-ring combat options, limited match types, career mode and stated that "WWE 2K is a bare-bones, yet mechanically functional mobile title".

References

2015 video games
Android (operating system) games
IOS games
Professional wrestling games
Video games developed in the United States
WWE video games